Hamed Al-Doseri  (born 24 July 1989) is a Bahraini professional footballer who plays as a goalkeeper for Al-Riffa.

External links

References

1989 births
Living people
Bahraini footballers
Bahrain international footballers
Association football goalkeepers
2015 AFC Asian Cup players
Al Hala SC players